Six Flags México is a amusement park located in the Tlalpan forest and borough, on the southern edge of Mexico City, Mexico. It is owned and operated by Six Flags, and is the most visited theme park in Latin America with 2.8 million annual visitors. It was previously known as Reino Aventura when it was Mexican-owned and featured the orca whale Keiko (from the movie Free Willy) as its principal attraction.

History
Reino Aventura (Spanish for "Adventure Kingdom") opened its gates on March 3, 1982, as the largest theme park in Latin America with a mascot named Cornelio, who was a purple cartoon dragon. Since its opening, no new attractions were added, thus attendance dropped. In 1992, the park was closed for an extensive remodeling as well as adding new rides, opening once again on July 3, 1993, with the new moniker El Nuevo Reino Aventura (The New Adventure Kingdom) featuring new rides such as Río Salvaje (Wild River, a raft ride), Viaje Inesperado (Unexpected Trip, a motion simulator), and Roller Skater (a Vekoma Kiddie Coaster). That same year, the feature film Free Willy was shot in the park. This attracted numerous animal rights organizations, which pressured the park to free the orca Keiko. After Keiko left, Cornelio the dragon became once again the Park's official mascot.

In 1999, Premier Parks bought Reino Aventura for an estimated $59 million. Under new administration, the park's name was officially changed to Six Flags. Twenty new attractions were added to the park, including Batman: The Ride, Kilahuea, and Medusa, a wooden roller coaster. It opened its gates again on April 14, 2000, as Six Flags México.

Premier Parks bought the rest of the stocks on Six Flags, and became Six Flags Inc., which is their current name. The latest coaster openings in Six Flags México include Superman el Último Escape (2004), The Dark Knight (2009), The Joker (2013), Medusa Steel Coaster (2014), and Wonder Woman Coaster (2018).

In 2011, the park opened Terminator X: A Laser Battle for Salvation, an indoor themed laser tag attraction. On September 6, 2012, Six Flags México announced The Joker a Gerstlauer spinning coaster for the 2013 season. The Joker was relocated from Six Flags Discovery Kingdom as Pandemonium from 2008-2012. Also announced is two new events in October and December, Festival del Terror and Christmas in the Park, both starting in 2012. 

In June 2013, Six Flags México announced on Facebook that an attraction at the park will be closing at the end of summer 2013. On July 1, 2013, Cowboy Stunt Show was announce for the park. On August 29, 2013, Six Flags officially announced the renovation of Medusa to Medusa Steel Coaster that will feature steel tracks and multiple inversions for the 2014 season. On August 28, 2014, it was announced that the park would get a Funtime Starflyer named Skyscreamer in 2015. On September 3, 2015, it was announced that the park would get Justice League: Battle For Metropolis 4D in 2016, like Six Flags Great America. On September 1, 2016, it was announced that the park would get new things in 2017. They announced The New Revolution Virtual Reality Coaster and Medusa Steel Coaster, a Mardi Gras festival, and a new water park called Hurricane Harbor.

Current attractions

Pueblo Mexicano (Mexican Village)

Pueblo Francés (French Village)

Pueblo Suizo (Swiss Village)

Pueblo Polinesio (Polynesian Village)

Villa Hollywood

DC Universe is a sub-section of Villa Hollywood, which includes rides themed to DC Comics.

DC Super Friends

Pueblo Vaquero (Cowboy Village)

Bugs Bunny Boomtown

Former attractions

Accidents
Carlos Joel Garza Marines, 15, fell ten meters from the "Rueda India" and broke his legs in March 2019.

Abdiel Alexey, an 18-year-old visitor, suffered a head injury after flying out of an unsecured seat on El Penguino (The Pinguin) in November 2020. Original reports had been that he died from the injury in the hospital, but it was later reported that he was recovering.

References
 https://www.milenio.com/negocios/six-flags-cierra-operaciones-semaforo-rojo-covid-19-cdmx

External links

Six Flags México
Mexico's Coaster Fan Club

 
Amusement parks in Mexico City
Mexico
2000 establishments in Mexico
Amusement parks opened in 2000